The origin of the Diocese of Aberdeen is unclear although Hector Boece, a 16th-century scholar, used unconvincing early charters to develop a history of the diocese. He described how a succession of 11th century bishops—Bean, Denortius and Cormac—were the first bishops of Mortlach. Boece then allowed a fourth Mortlach bishop, Nectan, to translate the see to Aberdeen in the first quarter of the 12th century. That the first bishop of Aberdeen was Nectan is conclusive but his emergence as described by Boece is dubious. Nectan's appearance as a note in the Book of Deer is undisputed and places him to c. 1132. The diocese was formed in the early part of the 12th century during changes in ecclesiastical authority. The papal bull of 1157 to Bishop Edward is the first direct documentary evidence of a bishop at Aberdeen. It referred to his cathedral and its proposed chapter and marked the beginning of the expansion of the diocesan organisation.

The national development of the parochial system accelerated under David I (1124-1153) although he can't be credited with its concept which had pre-existed in Scotland, as elsewhere, since the earlier Middle Ages. David formalalised the rights of the parish church, both territorially and legally. His reforms ensured that parishioners could sustain their priests by the provision of teinds. Church building and the supply of priests lay with local lords, just as they had always done, and who continued to exert their rights of patronage. To see themselves safely into the afterlife, the cadre of landowners granted the patronage of most of the churches either to the cathedral or to a monastery of choice. This now provided the opportunity for the substantial appropriation of the fruits of the parish churches to the major religious institutions. Consequently, the parish churches became impoverished both in terms of their sustenance and the quality of the priesthood. In most cases, cathedral annexations were of both the parsonages and the vicarages leaving a pensioned vicar, often uneducated, to provide for the cure of souls. The annexed churches formed prebends for the chapter and dignitaries of the cathedral. The prebendary then assumed the responsibility of adequate vicarage provision.

Over time, the chapter increased its numbers requiring further parish church annexations. Reconstruction of the cathedral began in the late 14th century and continued up to the 16th century.

History of the diocese 

The probably mythic origins of the diocese are contained in the cathedral's chartulary and identify the early bishops—Bean, Denortius, Cormac and Nectan—with Mortlach, in present-day Moray. This tradition was seemingly based on a series of early charters that are acknowledged to be fallacious. These charters allowed Hector Boece to construct a history that had successive Mortlach bishops, ending with its fourth prelate, Nectan, who then moved his see to Aberdeen. Outside of his appearance in one of the spurious charters, Nectan is only once documented as bishop of Aberdeen in a small note (c. 1132) made in the Book of Deer. Despite this, Mortlach did possess early ecclesiastical importance. A papal bull of 1157 by Pope Adrian IV confirmed the existence of a monasterium at Mortlach with five attendant churches as belonging to the diocese of Aberdeen. By the 11th century, this type of organisation was characteristic of Culdee (Céli Dé) settlements—the Culdees resembled communities of secular priests who ministered to the populations but were directed from the central mother church (the monasterium).  

Pope Adrian IV's bull of 1157 also confirmed to Bishop Edward the churches of Aberdeen, St Machar and St Nicholas, together with the town of Old Aberdeen and other lands. The bull authorised bishop Edward to establish a chapter in his cathedral, giving him the choice of introducing regular or secular canons as his clergy but nothing immediately came of this.  The lack of a means of funding a fully functioning unit of clerics may have accounted for this. Reforms in the 12th century were partially driven by local landowners who provided churches and priests which in turn led to a lessening in the importance of mother churches. The strongest stimulus for change took place under David I's influence when he introduced an ordinance that guarranteed the rights of the  parochial churches and their priests who were to be sustained by the levy of teinds. Consequentially, and particularly in areas of extensive feudal expansion of Anglo-Norman lords such as in the diocese of Aberdeen, had the effect of creating geographically based and viable parochial entities within the diocese. These local lords, with some regard for the hereafter, granted their right of patronage of the parish churches to the cathedral or to a monstery of their own choosing. This, taken together with newly founded monasteries, impacted upon the Culdee mother churches and pendicle churches to the extent that they were either reduced into becoming ordinary parish churches, such as Mortlach and Cabrach, or more rarely, were transformed into organisations that most closely resembled there former existence, i.e. as in the case of Monymusk, into a house of Augustinian canons regular.

The mechanism for the generation of income for the diocese was now available. The parish churches with their guaranteed income were soon to be the subject of appropriation by the large ecclesiastical corporations—the monasteries and cathedrals. At Aberdeen, the process of annexation may have begun as early as Bishop Edward's tenure and increased in line with the development of the chapter.  The enlargement was slow with incremental appointments of dignitaries continuing through to the mid-13th century when in 1249 Pope Innocent IV issued a bull to Bishop Peter Ramsay confirming the diocese constitution and a chapter consisting of five dignitaries and eight ordinary canonries all sustained on prebends. 

Appropriation of parish incomes to prebendary canons in the cathedral weakened the parish churches. The cathedral canons, possessing the fruits of both the parsonages and the vicarages, were responsible for appointing vicars to the parishes. Invariably, the vicars were paid meagre pensions and lacked security of tenure which resulted in inadequately educated clerics to deliver the cure of souls.

By 1488 the cathedral chapter had expanded to 29 canons supported by the income from 54 parish churches and of those, 42 were prebendal, one mensal and 11 held in common. 42 other parish churches were appropriated to monasteries and other ecclesiastical foundations and only 4 parishes—Cushnie, Forvie, Tough and Tyrie—remained independent. The diocese also included eleven hospitals/almshouses for the poor, aged or infirm parishioners. The religious Orders were also well represented—a Tironensian priory at Fyvie, a priory for Augustinian canons at Monymusk and a monastery at Deer for Cistercians. The Carmelite, Dominican, Franciscan and Trinitarian Friars all had houses in Aberdeen itself.

The reconstruction of the cathedral began when Bishop Alexander Kininmund (1355–80), probably nearing the end of his episcopacy, heightened the walls of the west towers and the nave. Bishop Henry Lichton (1422–40) completed what Kininmund had started and established the north transept but left the construction of the central tower incomplete. He was followed by Ingram Lindsay (1441–58) who roofed and paved the nave. Thomas Spens (1457–80) finely furnished the interior and Bishop William Elphinstone completed the central tower begun by Lichton. Elphinstone also commenced the rebuilding of a larger choir. The south transept was completed by Gavin Dunbar (1518–32) and provided the spires on the west towers. Dunbar was also responsible for the armorial adorned ceiling in the nave which displayed the coat-of-arms of the pontiff, the Scottish prelates and leading European rulers

Religious houses
The cathedral, parish churches and hospitals came under the jurisdiction of the bishop.  The monasteries were largely independent of the episcopacy but still needed the bishop if any of the brothers needed to be ordained to the priesthood.  The houses may also from time to time receive patronage from the bishop and chapter.

The cathedral

Bishops

 Nectan, fl. 1131/2
 Edward, fl 1147/51-1171
 Matthew, 1172-1199
 John, 1199-1207 
 Adam de Kalder, 1207-1228
 Matthew Scot, postulated 1228
 Gilbert de Stirling, 1228–39
 Radulf de Lambley, 1239–47
 Peter de Ramsey, 1247–56 
 Richard de Potton, 1256-70 or 1272
 Hugh de Benin, 1272–82
 Henry le Chen, 1282-1328
 Walter Herok, elect and provided but not consecrated, 1329
 Alexander de Kyninmund (I), 1329-1344
 William de Deyn, 1344-1350
 John Rait, 1350-1354/5
 Alexander de Kyninmund (II), 1355–80
 Simon de Ketenis, elected 1380 but not provided
 Adam de Tynyngham, 1380-9
 Gilbert de Greenlaw, 1390-1421
 Henry de Lychton, 1422-1440 translated from Moray
 Ingram Lindsay, 1441–58
 Thomas Spens, 1457-80 translated from Galloway
 Robert Blackadder, 1480–83
 William Elphinstone, 1483-1514 translated from Ross
 Alexander Gordon, 1514/15-18
 Robert Forman, before 1515-16
 Gavin Dunbar, 1518–32
 George Learmond, 1529–31
 William Stewart, 1532–45
 William Gordon, 1545–77

Cathedral chapter
The development of Aberdeen's chapter was lengthy even though the papal bull of 1157 gave Bishop Edward permission to institute a chapter of secular or monastic clerics. The first signs of chapter enlargement became apparent when a cleric designated as a 'canon' is seen witnessing an act by Bishop John (1199-1207). His successor, Bishop Kalder (1207-1228), had many canons acting as members of synodal sittings witnessing his episcopal edicts and with an archdeacon as the senior cleric. Bishop Stirling (1228-1239) continues this system but now this assembly is called a 'chapter' and has its own seal.  A canon is now designated 'treasurer' but the dean is still subordinate to the archdeacon. By 1239, Bishop Lamley is elected at a meeting chaired by the dean although it appears that the archdeacon is still his senior. In c. 1239 a canon had been elevated to the dignity of precentor and then in 1240, a chancellor was now visible.  In 1243 at a meeting of the chapter, it is evident that the dean was now the senior canon in the chapter. By 1445, the chapter consisted of 29 canonries—the dean, presenter, chancellor, and treasurer were the dignitaries, the archdeacon—no longer a dignatory—and 24 simple canonries made up the remainder. The last canonry to be created was that of the sub-chanter (1527x1534) bringing the total number of canons to 30. Between them, the chapter held 46 appropriated churches in the diocese of Aberdeen and a further 2 in the diocese of Moray.

Under Aberdeen Cathedral's written constitution, the bishop chose the entire chapter with the exception of the dean(decanus). The dean was elected to his position by the chapter after taking the solemn oath of fidelity and to uphold the rights, customs and liberties of the cathedral. He was then installed in the choir and provided with his place in the chapter by the bishop.  Canons took an oath of fidelity and of obedience to the bishop and to the chapter. The authoritative leader of the chapter was the dean and held total control over all who resided in the cathedral environs—this extended not only to the canons but also to the lesser ecclesiastics and servants. Next in importance was the precentor, usually referred to as the chanter (cantor). His responsibilities were to oversee the provision of the music used in the church services, to choose the choirboys, see to their education, and to employ a suitable song-school tutor. Next in importance was the chancellor (cancellarius) whose responsibilities included the composition of the chapter's correspondence and charters, communicating to the chapter the content of incoming letters and instructions that needed attention, and for being the custodian of the chapter's library. He also presided over the town's grammar school and selected its teacher. The fourth and last dignity was the treasurer (thesaurarius) whose duties included being the overseer of the church's trearures—items such as gold and silver drinking cups and expensive apparel. He needed to ensure that the church was adequately supplied with everyday needs such as candles, tapers, incense, charcoal, bread and wine for the services, and also mundane things such as mats and bullrushes for floor coverings.

Deaneries

A Deanery, sometimes known as an archdeaconry, is a geographical administrative subdivision within a diocese containing its designated parish churches. The archdeacon had responsibility for the deanery administration, its parishes, parish churches, chapels and clergy. He was assisted in this by the appointed dean of Christianity (later called rural dean) who was also one of the parochial clergy. His role was to visit each of his churches annually to inspect the internal and external fabric of the building and the propriety of its cleric. In the Aberdeen diocese, there were five deaneries—Aberdeen, Boyne, Buchan, Garioch and Mar.

Parish churches
The expression parochia changed over time from its original meaning in the 12th century of being the territory over which a bishop had authority to its later definition of being a locality that was subject to the ecclesiastic charge of a baptismal church.  This shift was complete by the 13th century when parochia and parochia ecclesia became entirely associated with the parish church.  The development of the parochial system in Scotland has been attributed to the reforming zeal of King David I and his introduction of Anglo-Norman lords yet it is also true that the process had begun under David's predecessors and the native Scottish aristocracy. Some parochial-type entities that had formed before David's reign remained unaltered under David's reshaping of the ecclesiastical landscape. Importantly, David played a significant role in institutionalising the sustainability of the parish unit.
The canonical statutes specified the conditions for parish churches. A church built from new had to be made of stone, glazed and erected and funded by the parishioners while the chancel's construction had to be at the rector's expense. The church had to be consecrated although it appears that this was frequently overlooked.  Again, at his own expense, the rector had to equip the church with furniture, a silver chalice, necessary books, altar coverings and candles. Failure to supply these items resulted in the benefices being suspended until compliance. These objects were now the property of the church and had to be left in good condition for the succeeding clergy.

Parish churches were a fundamental resource for large ecclesial establishments such as abbeys and cathedrals. This was achieved by the appropriation of the revenues of the churches to the detriment of the resident rectors, also called parsons. The negative impact of these appropriations led to the parsonage largely being confined to the few independent parishes.  The bishop always had to sanction appropriations within his diocese and the recipient of the appropriated parish assumed the obligations and revenues of the parsonage. To ensure that the needs of the parishioners were properly met, the beneficiary needed to establish a vicarage perpetual. This vicar held the rights to some of the fruits of the parish. Despite this, it became normal for these vicarage settlements to become formally part of the appropriation process and the cure of souls was then dispensed either by stipendiary pensioner vicars or parochial chaplains. These lowly clergymen were usually poorly paid and often uneducated.

Aberdeen
Dean of Christianity first recorded date:1250 x 1256

Boyne
Dean of Christianity first recorded date: 1250 x 1256

Buchan
Dean of Christianity first recorded date: 1199 x 1207

Garioch
Dean of Christianity first recorded date: 1240 x 1247

Mar
Dean of Christianity first recorded date: 1240 x 1247

Hospitals
Although many hospitals were dependent on monasteries, those in Aberdeen diocese were secular establishments subject to the authority of the bishop. The founding benefactors attached conditions to their altruism—those receiving care had to pray for the souls of their patron(s) who believed that as a result, they would receive a diminution of their time in purgatory. These hospitals operated under strict codes of conduct and, although secular, conformed to the discipline of a monastic rule, often that of St Augustine.

In the diocese of Aberdeen, eleven hospitals were established; of these five were in Aberdeen—three in the ecclesiastic burgh at Old Aberdeen, and two in the royal burgh at New Aberdeen in the harbour area. Diocese-wide, the reasons for these hospitals were categorised as for the care of:
 the poor – 4, 
 lepers – 3, 
 the sick (non-leper) – 1
 the sick (non-leper) and the poor – 1
 the elderly  – 1
 purpose unknown – 1

The Fourth Lateran Council of 1215 prohibited clerics and infirmerers from practising surgery if it included blood-letting but herbal therapies would have likely been available for the use of inmates. There is very little evidence that doctors attended to the needs of the inmates and the emphasis was more on the welfare of the soul than the body.  Most hospitals in Scotland were small in terms of inmates and only in a minority of cases did they house more than 20 residents. The last hospital to be built in the diocese of Aberdeen was the almshouse dedicated to St Mary, and founded by Bishop Gavin Dunbar in 1532 and had room for only 12 old men.

Monasteries
During the late Middle Ages, the bishop was given powers of visitation and correction over the religious houses within his jurisdiction. Despite this, some monastic orders sought and were granted exemption from diocesan audits while others submitted themselves to the bishop's scrutiny. In the Aberdeen diocese, since the Cistercians, Templars, Hospitallers and all of the Friar orders were exempt, the bishop's visitation would have only applied to the houses at Monymusk and Fyvie. The bishop also interacted with monasteries in other limited ways. Generally, monks were not clerics but laymen so for a monastic community to function, it needed the bishop to ordain enough of its numbers into holy orders to provide for its liturgical and sacramental needs. Only the bishop could consecrate monastery churches and chapels, and bless the alters with the necessary ecclesiastical utensils.  Also since many parish churches in the diocese were annexed to monasteries these appropriations had to be confirmed by the bishop who then needed to ensure that the monasteries continued to provide adequate vicarage provision for the cure of souls.

Notes

References

Sources

 
 
 
 
 
 
 
 
 
 
 
 
 
 
 
 
 
 
 
 
 
 
 
 
 

Aberdeen
Christianity in Aberdeen
1689 disestablishments
11th-century establishments in Scotland
Dioceses established in the 11th century
Former Roman Catholic dioceses in Europe

de:Bistum Aberdeen
it:Diocesi di Aberdeen